The 1973 College Football All-America team is composed of college football players who were selected as All-Americans by various organizations and writers that chose College Football All-America Teams in 1973. The National Collegiate Athletic Association (NCAA) recognizes six selectors as "official" for the 1973 season. They are: (1) the American Football Coaches Association (AFCA) which selected its team for Kodak based on a vote of the nation's coaches; (2) the Associated Press (AP) selected based on the votes of sports writers at AP newspapers; (3) the Football Writers Association of America (FWAA) selected by the nation's football writers; (4) the Newspaper Enterprise Association (NEA) selected based on the votes of sports writers at NEA newspapers; (5) the United Press International (UPI) selected based on the votes of sports writers at UPI newspapers; and (6) the Walter Camp Football Foundation (WC).

Five players are recognized by the NCAA as unanimous All-America selections. They are: (1) running back and 1973 Heisman Trophy winner John Cappelletti of Penn State; (2) offensive tackle John Hicks of Ohio State; (3) defensive end John Dutton of Nebraska; (4) middle guard Lucious Selmon of Oklahoma; and (5) linebacker Randy Gradishar of Ohio State.

Consensus All-Americans
The following chart identifies the NCAA-recognized consensus All-Americans for the year 1973 and displays which first-team designations they received.

Offense

Receivers 

 Lynn Swann, USC (AFCA, AP-1, FWAA, NEA-1, UPI-1, FN, Time, TSN)
 Wayne Wheeler, Alabama (WC, FN, TSN)
 Danny Buggs, West Virginia (AFCA, AP-2, UPI-2)
 John Holland, Tennessee State (Time)
 Hank Cook, New Mexico State (AP-3)
 Pat McInally, Harvard (NEA-2)

Tight ends 

 Dave Casper, Notre Dame (AFCA, AP-2, FWAA, NEA-1, UPI-1, WC)
 Andre Tillman, Texas Tech (AP-1)
 J.V. Cain, Colorado (NEA-2, Time, TSN)
 Randy Grossman, Temple (AP-3)
 Paul Seal, Michigan (UPI-2)

Tackles 

 John Hicks, Ohio St. (AFCA, AP-1, FWAA, NEA-1, UPI-1, WC, FN, Time, TSN)
 Booker Brown, USC (AFCA, AP-2, FWAA, NEA-1 [OG], UPI-2 [OG], FN [OG], Time, TSN [OG])
 Daryl White, Nebraska (AFCA, AP-2, NEA-2 [OG], UPI-1, FN, TSN [OG])
 Steve Riley, USC (Time, TSN)
 Al Oliver, UCLA (NEA-1)
 Henry Lawrence, Florida A. & M (NEA-2 [OG], Time)
 Eddie Foster, Oklahoma (WC)
 Charlie Getty, Penn State (AP-3, UPI-2 [OG])
 Jim O'Connor, Arizona (AP-3)

Guards 

 Buddy Brown,  Alabama (AFCA, AP-1 [OT], FWAA, UPI-1)
 Bill Yoest, N.C. State (AP-1, FWAA, NEA-2 [OT], UPI-1, WC, FN)
 Tyler Lafauci, LSU (AFCA, AP-1, NEA-1)
 Mark Markovich, Penn State (AP-2, UPI-2)
 Dave Manning, Utah State (AP-2)
 Frank Pomarico, Notre Dame (UPI-2)
 Dave Lapham, Syracuse (AP-3)
 Willie Viney, Pacific (AP-3)

Centers 

 Bill Wyman, Texas (AFCA, AP-1, FWAA, NEA-1, UPI-1, WC, FN)
 Scott Anderson, Missouri (AP-3, NEA-2, UPI-2, Time)
 Steve Corbett, Boston College (TSN)
 Steve Taylor, Auburn (AP-2)

Quarterbacks 

 David Jaynes,  Kansas  (AFCA, AP-1, NEA-2, UPI-1, WC, FN, Time, TSN)
 Danny White, Arizona State (AP-2, FWAA, NEA-1, UPI-2)
 Jesse Freitas, San Diego State (AP-3)

Running backs 

 John Cappelletti,  Penn St. (AFCA, AP-1, FWAA, NEA-1, UPI-1, WC, FN, Time, TSN)
 Roosevelt Leaks, Texas (AFCA, AP-1, FWAA, NEA-2, UPI-1, WC, FN)
 Woody Green,  Arizona St. (AFCA, AP-2, UPI-2, WC, TSN)
 Kermit Johnson, UCLA (AP-2, FWAA, NEA-1, UPI-2, FN)
 Tony Dorsett, Pittsburgh (AP-1, NEA-1, UPI-2)
 Bo Matthews, Colorado (Time)
 Archie Griffin, Ohio State (AP-2, NEA-2, UPI-1)
 Sonny Collins, Kentucky (NEA-2)
 Dickey Morton, Arkansas (AP-3)
 Barty Smith, Richmond (AP-3)
 Joe Washington, Oklahoma (AP-3)

Defense

Defensive ends 

 John Dutton, Nebraska (AP-1 [DT], UPI-1 [DT], NEA-1,  WC, AFCA, FWAA,  TSN [DT], Time, FN [DT])
 Dave Gallagher, Michigan (AP-1 [DT], NEA-1, WC, AFCA, FWAA, TSN [DT], Time)
 Van DeCree, Ohio State (UPI-1, FN)
 Roger Stillwell, Stanford (UPI-1, FN)
 Pat Donovan, Stanford (AP-1)
 Randy White, Maryland (AP-1)
 Fred McNeil, UCLA (TSN)

Defensive tackles 

 Ed Jones, Tennessee State (NEA-1, TSN [DE], Time)
 Randy Crowder, Penn State (UPI-1, FN)
 Bill Kollar, Montana State (NEA-1, Time)
 Paul Vellano, Maryland (AFCA)
 Charlie Hall, Tulane (WC)

Middle guards 

 Lucious Selmon, Oklahoma (AP-1, UPI-1, NEA-1, WC, AFCA, FWAA, FN)
 Tony Cristiani, Miami (FL) (WC, FWAA)

Linebackers 

 Randy Gradishar, Ohio St. (AP-1, UPI-1, NEA-1, WC, AFCA, FWAA,  TSN, Time, FN)
 Richard Wood,  USC (AP-1, UPI-1, WC, AFCA, FN)
 Rod Shoate, Oklahoma (AP-1, NEA-1, AFCA, FN)
 Ed O'Neil, Penn State (WC, Time, TSN)
 Woodrow Lowe, Alabama (NEA-1, FWAA)
 Warren Capone, LSU (AFCA, FWAA)
 Waymond Bryant, Tennessee State  (TSN, Time)
 Cleveland Vann, Oklahoma State (FWAA)

Defensive backs 

 Mike Townsend, Notre Dame (AP-1, UPI-1, NEA-1, WC, FWAA, TSN [S], Time, FN)
 Artimus Parker, USC  (AP-1, UPI-1, WC, Time)
 Dave Brown, Michigan (UPI-1, AFCA, FWAA)
 Randy Rhino, Georgia Tech (UPI-1, WC, AFCA)
 Jimmy Allen, UCLA (AP-1, NEA-1)
 Jeris White, Hawaii (TSN [CB], Time)
 Matt Blair, Iowa St. (AFCA)
 John Moseley Missouri (FWAA)
 Bill Simpson, Michigan State (TSN [CB])
 Carl Capria, Purdue (TSN [S])
 Kenith Pope, Oklahoma (Time)
 Harry Harrison, Mississippi (NEA-1)
 Eddie Brown, Tennessee (FN)
 Alvin Brown, Oklahoma State (FN)

Special teams

Kickers 

 Ricky Townsend, Tennessee  (FWAA, NEA-2)
 Efren Herrera, UCLA (TSN)
 Mike Lantry, Michigan (FN)

Punters 

 Chuck Ramsey Wake Forest,  (FWAA, NEA-1 [K], Time, TSN)

Returners 

 Steve Odom, Utah  (FWAA)

Key

Official selectors

Other selectors

See also
 1973 All-Big Eight Conference football team
 1973 All-Big Ten Conference football team
 1973 All-Pacific-8 Conference football team
 1973 All-SEC football team
 1973 All-Southwest Conference football team

References

All-America Team
College Football All-America Teams